The Golden Year is the only album  released by Camden synthpop band Ou Est le Swimming Pool.

Release
The album was originally intended for release in August 2010, but was delayed. The suicide of frontman Charles Haddon led to uncertainties about the status of the album; however the band's management issued a statement confirming its release in October 2010. It was followed by a fourth single, "The Key".

The original album had been leaked in early 2010, due to the sale of promotional copies on auction sites such as eBay. However, the track listing has since been altered, adding two new songs and removing one.

Track listing
"You Started"
"The Key"
"These New Knights"
"Dance the Way I Feel"
"Better"
"Outside"
"Jackson's Last Stand"
"Our Lives"
"Answers"
"Get Along"
"Curtain Falls"
"Next to Nothing"

The album's original track listing was in a different order. Two songs, "You Started" and "Answers" were added, whilst "The Feeling" was removed.

Charts

References

2010 debut albums
Ou Est le Swimming Pool albums
Albums published posthumously